Charles Symes Leslie Alford  ((b Bristol 7 February 1885 – d Wincombe 16 May 1963))  was Archdeacon of Bristol from 1938
to 1941.

Alford was born in Bristol and educated at Marlborough College and Corpus Christi College, Cambridge, during which time he was a member of its OTC. He was ordained deacon in 1908 and priest in 1909 . After a curacy in Barnard Castle he was with the  Royal Army Chaplains' Department from 1910 to 1927. He was then Vicar of Marshfield until his Archdeacon’s appointment. In later years he was Rector of Staple Fitzpaine and then Rowberrow.

References

1885 births
People educated at Marlborough College
Alumni of Corpus Christi College, Cambridge
Archdeacons of Bristol
1963 deaths